Ohmkar is an Indian film director and television presenter who predominantly works in Telugu television and films. He made his debut into television as a video jockey in the music show Ankitham on Gemini Music (Previously 'Aditya Music'). He is best known for producing and hosting television shows Maayadweepam, Aata and Sixth Sense. He is known for directing the Raju Gari Gadhi film series.

Early and personal life 
Ohmkar was born in Tenali, Andhra Pradesh, India. He was born into a Telugu-language speaking Hindu family. His father N. V. Krishna Rao worked as a doctor in Kakinada. He has two brothers and one sister. His brother Ashwin Babu is an actor in Tollywood and their other brother Kalyan Babu is a producer. His sister name is Srivalli.

He holds a bachelor's degree in Physiotheraphy from GBR AC Campus, Anaparthi, East Godavari, Andhra Pradesh. He married Swaroopa in 2011 and the couple have 1 child.

Career

2005–2011: Career in television 
Ohmakar made his debut into television as a video jockey in the music show Ankitham on Gemini Music (Previously 'Aditya Music'). In 2005, he created and presented dance reality show Aata on Zee Telugu. This show became widely popular on Telugu Television. People fondly started calling Ohmkar as 'Ohmkar Annayya'. He soon became one of the popular television celebrities.

He further produced, created and hosted many television shows like Maayadweepam, Challenge, 100% luck, etc. Ohmkar started a film and television production company OAK Entertainments which is headed by his brother Kalyan

2012: Debut into Tollywood 
He then turned into film director due to his passion to film making. He directed his first Tollywood film Genius, which didn't perform well. He introduced his brother Ashwin as an actor through this film. On the other side, he continued hosting television shows.

2013 
He got his big success for directing Raju Gari Gadhi in 2015 which was a commercial hit. Ohmakar created Raju Gari Gadhi (film series) and directed two other films in the series but didn't perform well.

Filmography

Television

References

External links 
 

Living people
People from Tenali
People from Guntur district
Male actors in Telugu television
Indian television personalities
Indian television producers
Telugu television anchors
Indian film directors
Telugu film directors
Telugu screenwriters
Indian male screenwriters
Indian screenwriters
Screenwriters from Andhra Pradesh
Film directors from Andhra Pradesh
Indian VJs (media personalities)
Indian game show hosts
21st-century Indian film directors
1980 births